Third interval may refer to one of the following musical intervals in equal-temperament tuning:
major third
minor third
augmented third
diminished third

Alternatively, it may apply to
neutral third

Table of thirds in equal temperaments tuning

See also
  List of musical intervals
 List of pitch intervals
 Third (music), which also includes third chords

Notes

References

 

Intervals (music)
Thirds (music)